InvestedIn is a crowd funding website for fund raising projects and charity events such as walkathons and celebrity cause-based campaigns. InvestedIn is also a technology provider offering a white label crowdfunding platform for commercial and non-profit use.

History 
InvestedIn was founded in 2010 by Alon Goren and Yadid Ramot. The company launched the service at the DEMO conference Founder Alon Goren used crowdfunding on stage to help sponsor their trip to the conference. InvestedIn raised $45,000 after being accepted to the AmplifyLA accelerator program.

Model
One of a number of fundraising platforms dubbed "crowd funding," the consumer facing website from InvestedIn allows anyone anywhere in the world to create a fundraising project. Unlike other crowdfunding websites, such as Kickstarter, InvestedIn doesn't limit the kinds of project they accept, allowing the community to decide which projects they like by voting with their dollars. Project creators also have additional flexibility in being able to choose from two campaign types, "tipping point" campaigns where they set a goal and only receive funds when their project meets or exceeds that goal, and "deadline" campaigns where they set a date and try to raise as much money as they can during a limited time frame. Funds are collected via credit card payment through a merchant processor.

InvestedIn takes 3% of any funds raised after a project becomes successful. The merchant processing provider used by InvestedIn also charges a percentage of 3-4% depending on the type of card used.

White Label Crowdfunding Platform

In addition to operating a crowd funding website InvestedIn also offers a technology solution to companies interested in operating their own crowdfunding website. Based on a client's needs, InvestedIn will customize their existing code and build new features based on client specifications and needs giving them a unique platform of their own. Numerous companies and non-profits have engaged InvestedIn to power their websites, including BoostFunder and BizWorld.

The company is also working with multiple companies that are getting ready to open crowdfunding portals for equity under the JOBS Act.

Accolades and News Coverage

Covered in the Wall Street Journal for work in niche crowdfunding. Also covered in The Pacific Coast Business Times.

Awarded "Best Marketplace Platform Funding Award" March 2012 by the Los Angeles Venture Association.

See also
 Comparison of crowd funding services

References

External links
 

Companies based in Santa Monica, California
Internet properties established in 2010
Crowdfunding platforms of the United States